Peder von Todderud  (17 July 1691 – 30 May 1772) was a Norwegian military officer and landowner.

Personal life
Todderud was born in Stange on 17 July 1691. He was the son of farmers Gulbrand Alfssøn and Birte Johannesdatter, and married Maren Olsdatter in 1720.

Career
Todderud started his military career in 1707. In 1750 he was promoted colonel and chief of Oppland Regiment. He was promoted major general in 1760, and retired in 1764. In 1751 von Todderud acquired the estate Åker in Vang, Hedmark, where he lived until his death in 1772.

References

1691 births
1772 deaths 
People from Stange
Norwegian Army generals 
Norwegian landowners